"We Are Never Ever Getting Back Together" is a song by American singer-songwriter Taylor Swift, taken from her fourth studio album, Red (2012). It was released for digital download and to U.S. pop radio as the lead single from Red on August 13, 2012, by Big Machine Records. Swift wrote and produced the song with Max Martin and Shellback. An upbeat incorporation of many pop styles, "We Are Never Ever Getting Back Together" contains pulsing synthesizers, processed guitar riffs, bass drums, and a spoken-word bridge. Its lyrics express Swift's frustration with an ex-lover who wants to rekindle their relationship. An alternate version was released to U.S. country radio on August 21, 2012.

Music critics praised the track for its catchy melody and radio-friendly sound, though some described its lyrics as subpar for Swift's songwriting abilities. The song appeared in year-end lists by Rolling Stone, Time, and The Village Voice. "We Are Never Ever Getting Back Together" peaked atop the charts in Canada and New Zealand, and reached the top five in Australia, Ireland, Israel, Japan, and the U.K. On the U.S. Billboard Hot 100, the single debuted at number 72 and rose to number one the following week, registering one of the biggest single-week jumps in chart history. The single spent a record-breaking nine consecutive weeks topping the Hot Country Songs chart and received multi-platinum certifications in Australia, Japan, New Zealand, and the U.S.

The music video for the song was released on August 30, 2012. The accolades that "We Are Never Ever Getting Back Together" received include a Billboard Music Award for Top Country Song, a Grammy Award nomination for Record of the Year, a CMT Music Award nomination for Best Music Video, and a People's Choice Award nomination for Favorite Song. Swift included the song on the set lists of four of her world tours: the Red Tour (2013–14), the 1989 World Tour (2015), Reputation Stadium Tour (2018), and the Eras Tour (2023). A re-recorded version of the song is featured on Red (Taylor's Version), Swift's 2021 re-recording of her 2012 album.

Background and release
After writing Speak Now (2010) entirely solo, Swift opted to collaborate with different songwriters and producers for Red. Thus, she called Max Martin and Shellback, two songwriters and producers whose work she admired, to discuss a possible collaboration. The trio conceived the concept for "We Are Never Ever Getting Back Together" shortly after a friend of Swift's ex-boyfriend walked into the recording studio and spoke of rumors he heard that Swift and her former flame were reuniting. After the friend left, Martin and Shellback asked Swift to elaborate on the details of the relationship, which she described as "break up, get back together, break up, get back together, just, ugh, the worst". When Martin suggested that they write about the incident, Swift began playing the guitar and singing, "We are never ever......", and the song flowed rapidly afterwards. She described the process as one of the most humorous experiences she had while recording, and said the musical partners matched her expectations. An audio clip of her sarcastically speaking about breakups can be heard before the final chorus.

The single was the lead single from Red. Swift premiered the single on August 13, 2012, during a live chat on Google+ with the song released on Google Play that day for digital download and to iTunes and Amazon.com the next day, August 14. A lyric video also premiered on Swift's official Vevo that same day. The song was released to Adult Contemporary radio stations on August 13, 2012 and to mainstream radio stations the next day. The song was released to country radio on August 21, 2012. The music video for the song premiered on August 30, 2012. A limited edition individually numbered CD single was released to Swift's official store and Amazon.com on September 4, 2012. The limited edition CD single was packaged with a "We Are Never Ever Getting Back Together" T-shirt and backpack. The CD single was also available for individual purchase. The CD single was released exclusively to US Walmart stores the same day.

Composition and lyrics

"We Are Never Ever Getting Back Together" is three minutes and 12 seconds long. Swift wrote and produced the song with Max Martin and Shellback. Written in the key of G major, it has a common time signature and a tempo of 86 beats per minute, with Swift's vocals spanning from G3 to D5. The production features prominent electronic elements—pulsing synthesizers, processed vocals, and a drum machine, alongside acoustic instruments of guitars and banjo. Musicologist James E. Perone noted that Swift's vocals on "We Are Never Ever Getting Back Together" are both robotic and humane, thanks to the balance between processed vocals during most of the verses and unprocessed vocals at the end of each refrain as well as in the bridge and the spoken interlude. The alternate version released to country radio incorporates a softer production.

In contemporary reviews, critics found "We Are Never Ever Getting Back Together" an incorporation of many pop-music styles. Jonathan Keefe of Slant Magazine and Spin described it as bubblegum pop, and AllMusic's Stephen Thomas Erlewine categorized the song as dance-pop. Meanwhile, Entertainment Weekly called it "a sublime explosion of Euro-pop glee". James Lancho, reviewing Red for The Daily Telegraph, called the song "sassy pop-rock in the mould of Katy Perry", and Marc Hogan of Spin deemed the single "saucy electro-pop". Steve Hyden, reflecting on the single in a 2021 article for The New York Times, characterized the song as electro-folk. Perone noticed influences of hip hop on the thumping bass drum, and commented that "We Are Never Ever Getting Back Together" is a musically flexible track, in that its song structure and melodic qualities resemble a conventional country song, but with modern influences of contemporary music that make it adaptable to many different genres.

The lyrics are about a protagonist's frustration over an ex-boyfriend who wants to rekindle their relationship. At one point, Swift sings, "And you would hide away and find your peace of mind/ With some indie record that's much cooler than mine," deriding the ex-boyfriend's pretentious music taste while referencing her own profession as a musical artist. Swift said that the cited lyrics were the song's most important detail because they reveal her real-life ex-boyfriend's judgement of her music, "It was a relationship where I felt very critiqued and subpar. He'd listen to this music that nobody had heard of ... but as soon as anyone else liked this band, he'd drop them." To this extent, she wrote "We Are Never Ever Getting Back Together" in hopes of commercial success to spite the ex-boyfriend, "Not only would it hopefully be played a lot, so that he'd have to hear it, but [also] it's the opposite of the kind of music that he was trying to make me feel inferior to."

Critical reception

Upon initial release, music critics commented on the single's pop production and related it to Swift's country-music identity. Robert Myers of The Village Voice felt that the song, while "good", was "not Swift at her best" and speculated that the decision to release it as a lead single was made for commercial reasons: "I doubt 'Never Ever' is even close to being the best song on Red; it's a teaser, an indication to her fans of what's coming up. That sounds like commercial calculation of the worst kind, but I don't think it is. Swift's connection with her audience is possibly more important than her connection with her boyfriends. And there is one brilliant touch: the spoken bit that comes after the middle eight." Grady Smith of Entertainment Weekly drew comparisons with Avril Lavigne and praised the "undeniable, instantly catchy hook". While describing the song as "joyous", he nevertheless expressed concern that the song's "juvenile sensibilities" marked a regression following Swift's work on Speak Now. Jody Rosen of Rolling Stone noted that the song's "hooks, plural, have a zing that's more Stockholm than Nashville. But it's unmistakably Taylor: a witty relationship postmortem, delivered in inimitable girlie-girl patois. And this bit – "I'm just, I mean, this is exhausting. Like, we are never getting back together. Like, ever" – might be the most sublime spoken-word interlude in pop since Barry White died."

Marah Eakin of The A.V. Club commented on "what a good song it is": "With its thumping kick drum, clipped syncopation, and mildly snarky lyrics, it's a teen dream in the vein of Swift's other sing-along jams like "Love Story" or "You Belong with Me." Kevin Coyne of Country Universe gave the song a failing D grade, calling it a "huge step backward". James Montgomery of MTV felt the "fantastic" song may "represent a turning point in her career ... Swift no longer has any interest in being the victim ... [She] displays a defiant, liberated streak". He noted that the song seemed "custom-crafted to dominate radio ... all shiny, silvery guitars and walloping, whomping choruses". Amy Sciarretto of Popcrush praised Swift for capturing a "universal feeling in an upbeat, empowering song" and described it as "one of the catchiest tunes she's ever penned". Jonathan Keefe of Slant Magazine described "the melodic hook" as the song's best attribute but criticized Swift's "stilted phrasing". He described her vocal performance as a "complete misfire", pointing out that her voice was at its "most unpleasant and nasal". However, Keefe warned that it was "premature" to say the "full-on pop" song "signals anything more than a temporary breakup". David Malitz of The Washington Post found the song immature and remarked, "the chorus is catchy but if this is representative of what awaits on Red, it's hard to be too excited". Glenn Gamboa of Newsday described it as "anthemic in a slick pop way, rather than her usual modern country way ... Part of T. Swizzle's charm is the way she makes her songs sound genuine and conversational and 'Never Ever' is no exception". Billy Dukes of Taste of Country stated that "[Swift] captures the anger of young love gone wrong better than anyone since, well…[Taylor] Swift" and that the song's melody is "difficult to embrace quickly." However, Camille Mann of CBS News considered the song to be "catchy".

"We Are Never Ever Getting Back Together" featured on 2012 year-end lists by Rolling Stone (second), Time (fourth), The Guardian (fifth), The Village Voices Pazz & Jop critics' poll (sixth), PopMatters (11th), NME (24th), and Consequence (40th). The single was named the 169th best song of 2010–2014 on Pitchfork's "The 200 Best Tracks of the Decade So Far (2010-2014)" list. It also received a Grammy nomination for Record of the Year for the 2013 Grammy Awards. In 2019, Stereogum ranked the song as the 71st best song of the 2010s. Rolling Stone ranked the song as the thirteenth-best female country song of the 2000s and 2010s. The Tampa Bay Times ranked it 4th on their list of the best 2010s pop songs. Critics have placed "We Are Never Ever Getting Back Together" highly on rankings of Swift's entire catalog; Hannah Mylrea from NME (2020) ranked it 15th out of 161 songs in Swift's discography, Nate Jones from Vulture (2021), 7th out of 179, and Sheffield (2021), 21st out of 206. Alexis Petridis from The Guardian ranked the track 11th on a 2019 ranking of Swift's 44 singles, deeming it "revitalised – smarter, snarkier and tougher" compared to the "artistically underwhelming" Speak Now.

Accolades

Commercial performance
In the U.S., "We Are Never Ever Getting Back Together" debuted at number 72 on the Billboard Hot 100 chart week ending August 25, 2012, based on two days of airplay. It rose to number one the following week, registering one of the biggest single-week jumps in chart history. Giving Swift her first Hot 100 number one, it made Swift the country artist with the most top-ten chart entries (11, tying with Kenny Rogers). It spent three non-consecutive weeks at number one, becoming the first country song to spend three or more weeks at number one after Kenny Rogers's "Lady" (1980). The single stayed in the top ten for thirteen non-consecutive weeks. On the Radio Songs chart, "We Are Never Ever Getting Back Together" entered at number 25, the highest debut for a song by a female country artist. It peaked at number three for three non-consecutive weeks, giving Swift her fourth top-ten entry. On the Hot Digital Songs chart, "We Are Never Ever Getting Back Together" debuted at number one with first-week sales of 623,000 digital copies in the week ending September 1, 2012, setting a record for the fastest-selling digital single by a female artist in Billboard chart history.

The single debuted at number 13 on the Hot Country Songs chart week ending September 1, 2012, based on airplay alone. After Billboard changed the methodology for the chart, incorporating digital sales and streaming into chart rankings in addition to airplay, "We Are Never Ever Getting Back Together" ascended to number one for the chart dated October 20, 2012, giving Swift her seventh Hot Country Songs number one. This prompted industry debate over the status of Swift as a country artist, given that "We Are Never Ever Getting Back Together" received lukewarm reception at country radio and never reached the top ten of the Country Airplay chart, and was more favorably received at pop radio. It remained on the top spot of the Hot Country Songs for nine consecutive weeks, breaking the eight consecutive weeks record of Connie Smith's "Once a Day" (1965) for the longest unbroken run at number one for a female artist. The song spent a total of ten weeks at number one, a career best for Swift and a record for the longest-run at number one for a female artist.

"We Are Never Ever Getting Back Together" peaked within the top ten of Billboard airplay charts including Adult Contemporary, where it reached number ten for seven non-consecutive weeks, Adult Top 40, where it reached number seven, and Mainstream Top 40, where it peaked at number two for four non-consecutive weeks. Roughly two months after its release, the single surpassed two million U.S. digital sales by September 2012, making Swift the first country artist two have six digital singles each sell over two million copies. By July 2019, "We Are Never Ever Getting Back Together" had sold 4.1 million copies in the U.S. The Recording Industry Association of America (RIAA) certified the single six times platinum, denoting six million units based on sales and streaming. In neighboring Canada, the single peaked atop the Canadian Hot 100, Swift's second number one following "Today Was a Fairytale" (2010). It was certified gold by Music Canada (MC).

Outside North America, "We Are Never Ever Getting Back Together" peaked atop the record chart in New Zealand, where it was certified double platinum by Recorded Music NZ (RMNZ). The single peaked within the top ten on charts in Israel (number two), Australia (number three), Ireland (number four), the U.K. (number four), Norway (number six), Hungary (number nine), and Spain (number nine). It peaked at number eight on Euro Digital Song Sales, a Billboard chart monitoring digital singles across Europe. The track was certified platinum in Sweden and the U.K., and five times platinum in Australia. By October 2014, the single had sold over 616,000 digital copies in the U.K. In Japan, "We Are Never Ever Getting Back Together" was a major chart hit, peaking at number two on the Japan Hot 100 and remained on the chart until 2015, three years after its release. The Recording Industry Association of Japan (RIAJ) awarded the single a "Million" certification for selling over one million digital copies.

Music video

Background and release
A music video for the song premiered on CMT, MTV and TeenNick  on August 30, 2012, at 7:49 pm Eastern time, and later on MTV.com, CMT.com, and VH1.com the same day at 8:00 pm Eastern time. The video is directed by Declan Whitebloom, with whom Swift has worked on the music videos for both "Mean" and "Ours". The video was shot like a pop-up book using a Sony F65 CineAlta camera with Leica 25 mm Summilux-C lens in one continuous shot with no editing, and features five sets and Swift in as many outfits. It is also the first music video to be featured in 4K resolution. According to Swift, she wanted the video to be as "quirky as the song sounds" and stated that "There's just knitting everywhere; there's just random woodland creatures popping up." Prior to the video's release, a fourteen-second preview was released by CMT on their official YouTube on August 30, 2012. As of October 2022, it has over 700 million views on YouTube.

Synopsis
The video, which is done as one continuous shot, begins with Swift in colorful pajamas recounting the events of her off and on again relationship with her ex-boyfriend (played by Noah Mills). The video then segues into Swift going into her living room where her band is dressed up in animal costumes and Swift belts out the chorus of the song. The video then goes to a TV where Swift says "Like, ever." and then to the dining room where we see she returns to recounting the events of her relationship and receives a phone call from her ex who is calling her from a nightclub. Swift hangs up on him and he walks off the screen into the nightclub. It then goes to the two in a truck having an argument and then to them having a stroll in the park. Swift then runs off and we see her on the phone telling the person on the other line how she and her ex are not getting back together and her frustration with their entire relationship. The video then segues back to Swift's living room where a party is going on and her ex shows up unannounced trying to woo her back and she slams the door in his face. The video ends with Swift on her window ledge where she was at the beginning of the video, singing the last line of the song.

Reception
James Montgomery of MTV praised the video stating that the video is "truly a treat to watch". Jim Farber of the New York Daily News comment on the video was that "[Swift's] tone and demeanor in the clip is conversational and sarcastic, ideally suited to simulating intimacy with her massive teen girl fan-base." Carl Williott of Idolator commented on the video's content and stated "what more could you ask for in a visual for a #1 pop smash?" Rolling Stone called it "flinging strong-willed sass". David Greenwald of Billboard stated that the video "is a quirky celebration that finds Swift singing and dancing with band members in animal costumes in between relationship flashbacks -- all filmed in an elaborate long shot. Swift wears large glasses and a pair of printed pajamas as she shrugs off her not-so-nice ex-boyfriend, a scruffy, seemingly older musician-type with a penchant for drama."

Live performances and usage in popular culture

Swift performed the song live for the first time at the 2012 MTV Video Music Awards on September 6, 2012, which was held at the Staples Center in Los Angeles. Swift was the last performance of the night and, wearing a red and white striped shirt and black shorts (reminiscent of a female circus ringmaster), began her performance in an area resembling a recording studio before taking the stage along with her back-up singers, dancers and band (in animal costumes) took the stage. Swift also performed the song live at the iHeartRadio Music Festival in 2012 and 2014. During her visit to Brazil, she performed the song on TV Xuxa and during a concert in Rio de Janeiro on September 13, 2012. "We Are Never Ever Getting Back Together" is the opening theme song of the reality TV show Terrace House: Boys × Girls Next Door, which began on October 12, 2012, and is included on some of its soundtracks.

Swift performed the song on the British version of The X Factor on October 14, 2012. She performed the song on the German TV show Schlag Den Raab. On January 25, 2013, Swift performed "We Are Never Ever Getting Back Together" at the Los Premios 40 Principales in Spain. The next day, she performed it in Cannes, France, during the NRJ Music Awards. On February 10, 2013, Swift performed the song at the 2013 Grammy Awards, opening the ceremony. She performs the song on her Red Tour nightly as the finale. A rock version of the song was performed on The 1989 World Tour. More recently, the song was performed as a mashup with "This Is Why We Can't Have Nice Things" as the finale on Swift's Reputation Stadium Tour. Swift performed the song on the iHeartRadio Wango Tango on June 1, 2019. On December 8, she performed an acoustic version of the song at Capital FM's Jingle Bell Ball 2019 in London. Swift included "We Are Never Ever Getting Back Together" on the set list of the Eras Tour (2023).

The song and video were parodied by teddiefilms in the style of Breaking Bad. The parody, called "We Are Never Ever Gonna Cook Together," was uploaded to YouTube  on October 18, 2012. The 22nd episode of Grey's Anatomy tenth season is titled "We Are Never Ever Getting Back Together". On September 8, 2012, YouTube star Shane Dawson, parodied the song, releasing a studio version and a music video on his YouTube channel.
Sky News remixed portions of speeches by David Cameron to make it appear as though he was reciting the chorus as a promotion for their coverage of the 2014 Scotland Independence Referendum.

Credits and personnel
Credits are adapted from the liner notes of the CD single.

 Taylor Swift – lead vocals, writer, producer, backing vocals
 Max Martin – producer, writer, keyboards
 Shellback – producer, writer, guitar, bass, keyboards, programming
 Tom Coyne – mastering
 Eric Eylands – assistant recording
 Serban Ghenea – mixing
 John Hanes – engineer
 Sam Holland – recording
 Michael Ilbert – recording
 Tim Roberts – assistant engineer

Charts

Weekly charts

Year-end charts

Decade-end charts

Certifications

Release history

"We Are Never Ever Getting Back Together (Taylor's Version)"

Swift re-recorded "We Are Never Ever Getting Back Together", subtitled "(Taylor's Version)", for her second re-recorded album, Red (Taylor's Version), released on November 12, 2021, through Republic Records.

Reception
Critics primarily focused on observations of Swift's delivery of certain phrases and words in the song. Some noted a dissimilarity between the "wee-ees"s of the original and re-recorded versions, with Olivia Horn of Pitchfork opining the re-recorded "wee-ee"s were more cloying than the original. Rob Sheffield of Rolling Stone stated that the song included "a little extra venom" when she delivered the words "trust me". According to Hannah Mylrea of NME, Swift's vocal maturity can be observed in the spoken-word moments, including in the line: "With some indie record that’s much cooler than mine". Variety posed the question as to whether the delivery of "What?" on the track was more or less insolent.

Charts

See also 
 List of Billboard Hot 100 number-one singles of 2012
 List of Billboard number-one country songs of 2012
 List of number-one digital songs of 2012 (U.S.)
 List of Canadian Hot 100 number-one singles of 2012
 List of number-one singles from the 2010s (New Zealand)

Footnotes

References

Sources

2012 singles
2012 songs
Taylor Swift songs
Billboard Hot 100 number-one singles
Canadian Hot 100 number-one singles
Number-one singles in New Zealand
Diss tracks
Bubblegum pop songs
Song recordings produced by Taylor Swift
Song recordings produced by Max Martin
Song recordings produced by Shellback (record producer)
Song recordings produced by Chris Rowe
Songs written by Taylor Swift
Songs written by Max Martin
Songs written by Shellback (record producer)
Big Machine Records singles
Dance-pop songs
American pop rock songs